Tarsozeuzera kochi is a moth in the family Cossidae. It was described by Georg Semper in 1896–1902. It is found in the Philippines.

References

Zeuzerinae